Legend is a 1985 American epic dark fantasy adventure film directed and initiated by Ridley Scott and starring Tom Cruise, Mia Sara, Tim Curry, David Bennent, Alice Playten, Billy Barty, Cork Hubbert, and Annabelle Lanyon. The film revolves around Jack, a pure being who must stop the Lord of Darkness who plots to cover the world with eternal night.

Although not a commercial success when first released, it won the British Society of Cinematographers Award for Best Cinematography in 1985 for cinematographer Alex Thomson, as well as being nominated for multiple awards: Oscar for Best Makeup; Academy of Science Fiction, Fantasy & Horror Films Saturn Award for Best Makeup; BAFTA Awards for Best Costume Design, Best Makeup Artist, Best Special Visual Effects; DVD Exclusive Awards; and Young Artist Awards. Since its premiere and the subsequent release of the unrated Director's Cut, the film has become a cult classic.

Plot

In order to cast the world into eternal night, the Lord of Darkness sends the goblin Blix to kill the unicorns in the forest near his castle and bring him their horns. Told by Darkness that the best bait is Innocence, Blix and his colleagues Pox and Blunder follow Princess Lili as she visits her forest-dwelling paramour, Jack in the Green. There Jack teaches Lili to speak to animals, then takes her blindfolded to a forest stream where he senses the unicorns will appear. When Lili holds out her hand to touch the stallion, Blix shoots him with a poison dart from his blowpipe and the unicorns flee. Jack is angry, but Lili laughs off his concern and issues a challenge by throwing her ring into a pond, declaring she will marry whoever finds it. While Jack dives in after the ring, the goblins track down the poisoned stallion and sever his alicorn, causing winter to descend. Lili runs off in terror, and Jack is barely able to break through the surface of the now-frozen pond.

Lili takes refuge in the cottage of a peasant family that is now frozen in time. While there, Lili sees the goblins test the alicorn's magic powers and overhears how she was the bait in their slaying of the stallion. She follows the goblins to a rendezvous with Darkness, who tells them the world cannot be cast into eternal night as long as the surviving mare still lives. Blunder unsuccessfully tries using the alicorn to overthrow Darkness and is sent into the castle's dungeon. Meanwhile, Jack, accompanied by the forest elf Honeythorn Gump, the fairy Oona, and the dwarves Brown Tom and Screwball, finds the mare mourning the lifeless stallion. Lamenting over his role in their current predicament, Jack apologizes to the mare, who communicates to him that the alicorn must be recovered and returned to the stallion by a great hero. Deciding Jack is that hero, the group leaves Brown Tom to guard the unicorns while Jack and the others retrieve a hidden cache of ancient weapons and armor. In their absence, Lili warns Brown Tom of the goblins coming back to kill the mare. He is then incapacitated by the goblins, who capture both Lili and the mare.

Upon returning, Jack and his group make their way to Darkness' castle. On the way, they are attacked by a swamp hag named Meg Mucklebones, but Jack defeats her by flattering her appearance and then decapitating her. At the castle, Jack's group falls into an underground prison cell, where they encounter Blunder, who is revealed to be a fairy gone astray, before he is dragged off by an ogre to be baked into a pie. Oona uses her magic to escape their cell and retrieves the keys to free the others.

Meanwhile, as Lili roams the castle seeking warmth and escape, a dark, dancing entity appears to tempt and turn her into a gothic version of herself. Darkness orchestrated this to claim her as his bride, and seemingly seduced, she agrees to wed him on condition that she will be the one to kill the mare in the upcoming ritual. Overhearing their conversation, Jack and Gump learn Darkness can be destroyed by daylight. After saving Blunder, the group takes the ogres' giant metal platters as makeshift mirrors to reflect sunlight into the chamber where the mare is to be sacrificed.

As the ritual begins, Lili tries to free the mare, but Darkness casts onto her a spell of sleep. Jack's group redirects the setting sun with the platters as he fights Darkness, finally wounding him with the stallion's alicorn right before the redirected sunlight shines into the room, blasting Darkness to the edge of the eternal void. Darkness warns them that because evil lurks in all beings, he will never truly be vanquished. Wavering in doubt, Jack finally severs the hands of Darkness, thus expelling him into the void. Gump then returns the stallion to life by magically reattaching its alicorn. With the stallion reunited with the mare, winter suddenly ends. Jack retrieves Lili's ring from the pond and places it on her finger, waking her from the spell.

Alternate endings
There are three different versions of the film's conclusion:
 In the Director's Cut, Lili wakes with Jack trying to convince her she was merely dreaming, but she is ultimately unconvinced. They confess their true love for each other, but realize they live in two different lifestyles, which causes Lili to request continuing a merely platonic relationship. Jack, happy with this request for the first time, accepts. Lili returns to her home to assume her responsibilities, promising to visit him again. Jack happily runs off into the sunset, hailed by the forest fairies and the revived unicorns.
 In the American theatrical version, Jack and Lili assure each other of their love and watch the unicorns reunite, and they run off into the sunset together, hailed by the forest fairies and the unicorns. Darkness watches them from the void, laughing.
 The European version also ends with both Jack and Lili running off into the sunset, but without Darkness's final appearance.

Cast
 Tom Cruise as Jack O' the Green, a green man of the forest
 Mia Sara as Princess Lili
 Tim Curry as the Lord of Darkness
 David Bennent as Honeythorn Gump, an elf and guardian of the forest
 Alice Playten as Blix, the leader of Darkness's goblin minions. Also dubbed Gump's voice.
 Billy Barty as Screwball
 Cork Hubbert as Brown Tom
 Peter O'Farrell as Pox
 Annabelle Lanyon as Oona
 Kiran Shah as Blunder
 Robert Picardo as Meg Mucklebones

Cast notes:
 Alice Playten is also the uncredited voice of Gump, because an executive thought that Bennent's voice sounded too German.

Production

Development
While filming The Duellists in France, Ridley Scott conceived Legend after another planned project, Tristan and Isolde, fell through temporarily. However, he believed that it would be an art film with limited audience appeal and went on to make Alien and did pre-production work on Dune, another halted project, which was eventually finished by director David Lynch. Frustrated, he came back to the idea of filming a fairy tale or mythological story.

For inspiration, Scott read all the classic fairy tales, including ones by the Brothers Grimm. From that, he conceived a story about a young hermit who is transformed into a hero when he battles the Darkness in order to rescue a beautiful princess and release the world from a wintery curse.

Screenplay
Scott wanted Legend to have an original screenplay because he believed that "it was far easier to design a story to fit the medium of cinema than bend the medium for an established story". By chance, he discovered several books written by American novelist William Hjortsberg and found that the writer had already written several scripts for some unmade lower-budgeted films. Scott asked him if he was interested in writing a fairy tale. He was already writing some and agreed. Scott remembers, "The first notion was to actually make a classical fairy story, but if you actually analyze a classical fairy story, most are either very short, or very complex". The two men bonded over Jean Cocteau's 1946 film of Beauty and the Beast. In January 1981, just before beginning principal photography on Blade Runner, Scott spent five weeks with Hjortsberg working out a rough storyline for what was then called Legend of Darkness.

Originally, Scott "only had the vague notion of something in pursuit of the swiftest steed alive which, of course, was the unicorn". Scott felt that they should have a quest and wanted unicorns as well as magic armor and a sword. Hjortsberg suggested plunging the world into wintery darkness. Hjortsberg's first draft of Legend of Darkness also had Princess Lili slowly transform into a clawed and fur-covered beast who is whipped and sexually seduced by the antagonist (called Baron Couer De Noir in this draft). Scott wanted to show the outside world as little as possible and they settled on the clockmaker's cottage.

Initially, the quest was longer, but it was eventually substantially reduced. Scott wanted to avoid too many subplots that departed from the main story and go for a "more contemporary movement rather than get bogged down in too classical a format". By the time Scott had finished Blade Runner, he and Hjortsberg had a script that was "lengthy, hugely expensive, and impractical in its size and scope". They went through it and took out large sections that were secondary to the story. The two men went through 15 script revisions.

Pre-production
The look Scott envisioned for Legend was influenced by the style of Disney animation. He had even offered the project to Disney, but they were intimidated by the film's dark tone at a time when Disney still focused on family-friendly material. Visually, Scott referenced films like Snow White and the Seven Dwarfs, Fantasia and Pinocchio. The look of Legend was also influenced by the art of Arthur Rackham and Heath Robinson. Scott had initially sought the services of conceptual designer Brian Froud, but was turned down. He then hired Alan Lee as a visual consultant, who drew some characters and sketched environments. However, Scott eventually replaced Lee with Assheton Gorton, a production designer whom he had wanted for both Alien and Blade Runner. Scott hired Gorton because he knew "all the pitfalls of shooting exteriors on a soundstage. We both knew that whatever we did would never look absolutely real, but would very quickly gain its own reality and dispense with any feeling of theatricality".

Scott also consulted with effects expert Richard Edlund because the director did not want to limit major character roles to the number of smaller people who could act. At one point, the director considered Mickey Rooney to play one of the major characters but he did not look small enough next to Tom Cruise. Edlund considered shooting on 70 mm film stock, taking the negative, and reducing the actors to any size they wanted—but this was deemed too expensive. Thus, Scott was tasked with finding an ensemble of small actors. Legend would be financed with a budget of $24.5 million, and would be distributed by Universal Pictures in North America and by 20th Century Fox in all other territories.

In order to achieve the look of Legend that he wanted, Scott scouted locations in the Sequoias of Yosemite National Park to see the grand scale of trees there. "The whole environment is so stunning ... It was so impressive, but I didn't know how you would control it". However, it would cost too much to shoot on location and he decided to build a forest set on the 007 Stage, named after and used for many James Bond films, at Pinewood Studios. The crew spent 14 weeks constructing the forest set, and Scott was worried that it would not look real enough. It was only days before the start of principal photography that it looked good enough to film. The trees were 60 feet high with trunks 30 feet in diameter and were sculpted out of polystyrene built onto tubular scaffolding frames. In addition, other sets were constructed on five huge soundstages.

Casting
Johnny Depp, Jim Carrey and Robert Downey Jr. were considered for the role of Jack. While Scott was considering Richard O'Brien to play Meg Mucklebones, he watched The Rocky Horror Picture Show and saw Tim Curry. He thought the actor would be ideal to play Darkness because the actor had film and theatrical experience. Tim Curry's makeup as Darkness in Legend is considered to be one of the most iconic images in all of fantasy cinema. Scott discovered Mia Sara in a casting session and was impressed by her "good theatrical instincts".

Makeup effects
Scott contacted Rob Bottin, who designed the special makeup effects for The Howling, about working on Blade Runner, but Bottin was already committed to John Carpenter's The Thing. Scott told him about Legend, and toward the end of production on The Thing, Bottin read a script for the film and saw an excellent opportunity to create characters in starring roles.

After wrapping his work with Carpenter, Bottin met with Scott to reduce the thousands of creatures suggested by the script to a manageable quantity. The process would involve complicated prosthetic makeup that would be worn for up to 60 days with some full body prosthetics. According to Bottin, at the time, Legend had the largest makeup crew ever dedicated to one project. Bottin divided his facility into different shops in order to cover the immense workload. As actors were cast, Bottin and his crew began making life casts and designed characters on drafting paper laid over sketches of the actors' faces. He designed the prosthetics in his Los Angeles studio and spent some time in England occasionally helping with the application of makeup.

With the exception of Cruise and Sara, all the principal actors spent hours every morning having extensive makeup applied. Between 8 and 12 prosthetic pieces were applied individually to each face, then made up, molded and grafted into the actor's face so that the prosthetics moved with their muscles. Each person needed three makeup artists working on them for an average time of three and a half hours spent applying prosthetics. Actor Tim Curry took five and a half hours because his entire body was encased in makeup, the film's most challenging character design.

Curry had to wear a large, bull-like structure atop his head with three-foot fiberglass horns supported by a harness underneath the makeup. The initial design of the horns placed a strain on the back of the actor's neck because they extended forward and not straight up but Bottin and his crew eventually reduced the weight of the horns. At the end of the day, he spent an hour in a bath in order to liquefy the soluble spirit gum. At one point, Curry became claustrophobic, got too impatient, and pulled the makeup off too quickly, tearing off his own skin in the process. Scott had to shoot around the actor for a week as a result.

Principal photography
Principal photography began on March 26, 1984 on the 007 Stage at Pinewood Studios. On June 27, 1984, with ten days filming left on this stage, the entire set burned down during a lunch break. Reportedly, flames from the set fire leapt more than 100 feet into the air and the clouds of smoke could be seen five miles away. It occurred during lunchtime, and no one was hurt. Scott quickly made changes to the shooting schedule and only lost three days moving to another soundstage. Meanwhile, the art department rebuilt the section of the forest set that was needed to complete filming. Due to the fire, the scenes of Lili meeting the unicorns for the first time and finding the cottages in the snow were filmed in the garden of the main house behind Shepperton Studios. The underwater scenes were filmed in Silver Springs, Florida for the "purity" of the water. Cruise did all his own diving and swimming in waters that, according to Scott, had real alligators 25 feet from where they were filming.

Post-production
Scott's first cut of Legend ran 125 minutes long. He then believed there were minor plot points that could be trimmed and cut the film down to 113 minutes, so he tested this version for an audience in Orange County. However, it was decided that the audience had to work too much to be entertained, and another 20 minutes was cut. The 95-minute version was shown in Great Britain and then the film was cut down even further to 89 minutes for North America.

At the time, Scott said, "European audiences are more sophisticated. They accepted preambles and subtleties whereas the U.S. goes for a much broader stroke." He and Universal delayed the North American theatrical release until 1986 so that they could replace Jerry Goldsmith's score with music by Tangerine Dream, Yes lead singer Jon Anderson, and Bryan Ferry.

Scott allowed Goldsmith's score to remain on European prints and the composer said, "that this dreamy, bucolic setting is suddenly to be scored by a techno-pop group seems sort of strange to me". Normally, Goldsmith would spend 6–10 weeks on a film score, but for Legend, he spent six months writing songs and dance sequences ahead of time.

In 2000, Universal unearthed an answer print of the 113-minute preview cut with Jerry Goldsmith's score. This print had minor visual anomalies that were eventually digitally replaced, occasionally with finished shots from the 89-minute U.S. version. This edition is Scott's preferred 2002 "Director's Cut", with the restored Jerry Goldsmith soundtrack. The Director's Cut's source is one of only two prints of this extended version known to exist, used for Universal's 2002 DVD (and eventual Blu-ray) "Ultimate Edition".

Reception
Legend received mixed reviews. The film holds a 41% approval rating on the review aggregator site Rotten Tomatoes based on 44 reviews, with an average rating of 5/10. The consensus reads: "Not even Ridley Scott's gorgeously realized set pieces can save Legend from its own tawdry tale -- though it may be serviceable for those simply looking for fantasy eye candy."

Steve Biodrowski of Cinefantastique praised the film, highlighting the makeup design by Rob Bottin and Tim Curry's performance as Darkness, saying that "[b]ecause of the visuals (and Curry's performance, which is mostly limited to the last 20 minutes), the film is worth seeing". Widgett Walls of needcoffee.com also praised the film, once again highlighting Bottin's makeup, focusing on the character of Darkness, saying simply that "Tim Curry's Darkness is absolutely incredible."

Vincent Canby of The New York Times said that "[i]t's a slap-dash amalgam of Old Testament, King Arthur, "The Lord of the Rings" and any number of comic books." Kevin Thomas of the Los Angeles Times praised the visuals as "a sumptuous, richly colored feast for cinematographer Alex Gordon's camera", but thought the film "surely could have used more humor and invention". Kim Newman of The Monthly Film Bulletin wrote that "like Blade Runner before it, the film suffers so much from an over-emphasis on details at the expense of the actual story that it becomes a plodding bore." Gene Siskel of the Chicago Tribune gave the film half of one star out of four and stated that writing the review was "akin to recalling a bad dream", concluding that "I don't want to remember any more about Legend than to make sure I include it in my 'worst films of 1986' list and never rent it when it comes out as a video cassette." The film has been described as the "extinction event" that discouraged Hollywood from making fantasy films.

Roger Ebert of the Chicago Sun-Times praised Bottin's makeup and Assheton Gorton's set design and the performances of Tim Curry and Tom Cruise, but noted that the effects were so good that the roles could have been played by almost anyone. Ebert also said that the movie was composed of all of the right ingredients to be successful, but that the film simply "doesn't work". He went on to say that "[a]ll of the special effects in the world, and all of the great makeup, and all of the great Muppet creatures can't save a movie that has no clear idea of its own mission and no joy in its own accomplishment". However, with the release of the 2002 Director's Cut, he agreed with many fans on how it was intended to question the balance between good and evil, and gives the main characters moral flaws to display the imperfections of humans. The release of the Director's Cut in 2002 also had the original score from Jerry Goldsmith restored, and brought renewed attention to the film. Both Ridley Scott and Tom Cruise have requested their fans to view this version, even to the extent of Cruise disowning the US version entirely as a "stereotypical 80's fantasy".

Neil Gaiman reviewed Legend for Imagine magazine, and stated that "Glimmers of intelligence show here and there in the script, suggesting that William Hjortsberg probably had some idea of what he was doing when he wrote this - understanding that fairies are wilful, capricious creatures, for example - and he'll probably make a fairly good novel out of it, but if you go and see the film don't say I didn't warn you."

Audiences surveyed by CinemaScore gave the film a grade "C+" on scale of A+ to F.

Soundtrack

Due to the changes in the film from its European and American releases, Legend has two different soundtracks. The first, produced, composed and conducted by Jerry Goldsmith, was used for its initial European release and restored in the director's cut edition of the Region 1 DVD release. The second soundtrack features music by German electronic artists Tangerine Dream and was used for the initial theatrical and home video releases in the United States. This soundtrack also includes songs by Jon Anderson of Yes and Bryan Ferry of Roxy Music.

The following songs are featured in the European and Director's Cuts, with lyrics composed by John Bettis (composer of many Carpenters songs) and music by Jerry Goldsmith:
 "My True Love's Eyes" (the main theme, sung mostly by Lili. Mia Sara provided some of the singing, while session singers provided vocals wherever Sara was unable to perform).
 "Living River" (the first reprise of "My True Love's Eyes", sung as Lili calls to the unicorn).
 "Bumps and Hollows" (sung by Lili after her forbidden act of touching a unicorn).
 "Sing The Wee" (the theme for the fairies. The first sung version was cut from all editions of the film as it accompanied a scene with Jack and the fairies that was itself cut; the final sung version by the National Philharmonic Chorus is heard over the end credits).
 "Reunited" (the final reprise of "My True Love's Eyes", sung by Lili as she says goodbye to Jack).

The following songs appeared in the 89-minute U.S. re-cut when it was re-scored by Tangerine Dream:
 "Loved by the Sun" (music by Tangerine Dream, lyrics written and sung by Jon Anderson).
 "Is Your Love Strong Enough" (written and performed by Bryan Ferry over the U.S. print's end credits).

A promotional music video (presumably for the U.S. market, where the Tangerine Dream soundtrack was used) was created for the Bryan Ferry song "Is Your Love Strong Enough". The video, which incorporates Ferry and guitarist David Gilmour into footage from the film, is included as a bonus on disc 2 of the 2002 "Ultimate Edition" DVD release.

Home media

In 2002, Universal released the 113-minute Director's Cut on Region 1 DVD, restoring previously cut scenes and the original Goldsmith score.

Universal released a Blu-ray version of the "Ultimate Edition" on May 31, 2011. With the exception of the 2002 DVD-ROM features, this disc carries over all the content from the DVD, including the Jerry Goldsmith-scored "Director's Cut" and the Tangerine Dream-scored theatrical version.

In the 1980s, Warner Home Video released Legend on VHS in the United Kingdom.

20th Century Studios—the international rights holder via Walt Disney Studios Motion Pictures—has released a Blu-ray issue for Region 2 of both the 94-minute European version and the 113-minute Director's Cut, both with Jerry Goldsmith's music.

In September, 2021, the film was reissued yet again by Arrow Films (under license from Universal) as a 2-disc "Limited Edition" including the two major cuts of the movie (theatrical and Director's Cuts with their respective corresponding scores), with nearly all the bonus content from the previous Universal releases, plus new documentaries on the film. The International Version was not included on this new set as the rights to that edition are held by The Walt Disney Company (via the library of 20th Century Studios).

See also
The Last Unicorn
Krull
Labyrinth

Notes

References

External links

 
 
 
 
 
 Ridley Scott's LEGEND FAQ

1985 films
1980s fantasy adventure films
1980s romantic fantasy films
20th Century Fox films
American dark fantasy films
American fantasy adventure films
American romantic fantasy films
The Devil in film
1980s English-language films
Films about fairies and sprites
Films about unicorns
Films directed by Ridley Scott
Films scored by Jerry Goldsmith
Films scored by Tangerine Dream
Films set in castles
Films set in hell
Films shot at Pinewood Studios
American high fantasy films
Universal Pictures films
Films produced by Arnon Milchan
1980s American films